Jared Tallent OAM (born 17 October 1984) is an Australian race walker and Olympic gold medallist in the 50 km walk from London in 2012. He is a four-time Olympic medallist, three-time World Championship medallist and holds the current Olympic record in the 50 km walk.

Personal
Tallent was born on 17 October 1984 in Ballarat, Victoria. He is one of six children and his parents own a potato farm near Ballarat. 
Tallent attended Dean Primary School and Ballarat High School. 
He married race walker Claire Woods in Walkerville, South Australia in August 2008. 
They welcomed their first son, Harvey Sebastian Tallent, into the world on 25 May 2017.

Athletics career
Tallent finished third in the 20 km walk at the 2008 Olympic Games in Beijing to claim his first Olympic medal.  He received a silver medal for finishing second in the 50 km walk a week later, becoming the first Australian to win two athletic medals in the same Olympics since 1972 and the first male Australian to do so in 102 years. In the 20 km walk and 50 km walk at the 2009 World Championships in Athletics, he finished in sixth and seventh position respectively. Tallent returned to the medal dais in 2010 when claiming a bronze medal in the 50 km Walk at the 24th World Race Walking Cup held in Chihuahua, Mexico. Later on that year Tallent took home gold in the 20 km walk at the 2010 Delhi Commonwealth Games.

He opened his 2011 season with a win at the Australian 20 km walk championships, while his wife Claire Tallent secured the women's title. At the 2011 IAAF World Athletics Championships, he won the bronze medal in the Men's 50 km walk.  On 24 March 2016, original gold medalist Sergey Bakulin had his results disqualified for doping, advancing Tallent's medal to silver.  Also advancing his medal was Denis Nizhegorodov, whose A sample also tested positive.  Nizhegorodov was fortunate his B sample could not confirm doping and he retains the medal.

At the 2012 London Olympics, Tallent finished 7th in the 20 km walk. A week later he won the gold medal in the 50 km walk in a personal best time and Olympic Record of 3:36:53. Tallent was initially awarded the silver medal, but on 24 March 2016 the Court of Arbitration for Sport disqualified all results, in the period from 20 August 2009 to 15 October 2012, of doper Sergey Kirdyapkin, who had been the first walker across the line.  Tallent received his gold medal for the 2012 Olympics on 17 June 2016 in a special ceremony.

Tallent won the bronze medal in the Men's 50 km walk at the 2013 IAAF World Athletics Championships in Moscow, Russia. It was his second world championships medal. In 2015, Tallent won his third World Championships medal with silver in the 50 km walk at the 2015 IAAF World Championships in Beijing, China.

At the 2016 IAAF World Race Walking Cup in Rome, Italy, Tallent was initially awarded the silver medal behind Alex Schwazer, the 2008 Olympic gold medallist who had just returned from a four-year doping ban. However, in August 2016 the Court of Arbitration for Sport disqualified Schwazer from 1 January 2016, due to him yet again failing a drug test and Tallent was retrospectively awarded the gold medal.

At the 2016 Rio Olympics, he won the silver medal in the Men's 50 km walk. As a result of winning four Olympic medals, he became Australia's most prolific Olympic male track and field medallist.

Tallent withdrew from the 50 km walk at the 2017 World Championships in Athletics due to a hamstring injury.

Tallent announced his retirement in March 2021 after failing to overcome a hamstring injury before the 2021 Australian Olympic selection trials.

He was coached by Brent Vallance at the Australian Institute of Sport in Canberra between 2004 and 2012.

Achievements

2016 Olympic gold medal presentation
Tallent originally finished second in the 50 km walk at the 2012 London Olympics. In March 2016, Court of Arbitration for Sport stripped London gold medallist Sergey Kirdyapkin of all his results for the period of 20 August 2009 to 15 October 2012 for doping. Tallent was then awarded the gold medal. On 17 June 2016, 1460 days after his London 50 km race, Tallent was presented his gold medal on steps of the Victorian Parliament and this ceremony followed International Olympic Committee protocol with Australian Olympic Committee President John Coates presenting him the gold medal, Athletics Australia President Mark Arbib presenting a bunch of flowers and the national anthem being played whilst the Australian flag was raised. Tallent made the following comments when interviewed during the ceremony:

2018 IAAF gold medal presentation
In May 2018 at an IAAF ceremony in Taicang, China, Tallent was awarded two gold medals from the 2012 and 2016 IAAF World Race Walking Team Championships 50-kilometre race walk, following the confirmed positive doping test of the 2016 first-placed race walker Alex Schwazer (ITA) and a previously confirmed series of abnormalities in the Athlete Biological Passport profile of 2012 first-placed Sergey Kirdyapkin (RUS) and second-placed Igor Erokhin (RUS).

Recognition
2009 and 2010 - Athletics Australia "Out of Stadium" athlete award 
2012 - Australian Flame Athlete of The Year
2016 - Order of Australia
2016 -  Australian Flame Male Athlete of The Year

References

External links
 
 
 Jared Tallent at Australian Athletics Historical Results
 Jared Tallent at Australian Olympic Committee Rio Games

1984 births
Athletes (track and field) at the 2006 Commonwealth Games
Athletes (track and field) at the 2010 Commonwealth Games
Athletes (track and field) at the 2008 Summer Olympics
Athletes (track and field) at the 2012 Summer Olympics
Athletes (track and field) at the 2016 Summer Olympics
Australian Institute of Sport track and field athletes
Australian male racewalkers
Commonwealth Games bronze medallists for Australia
Commonwealth Games gold medallists for Australia
Commonwealth Games medallists in athletics
Living people
Medalists at the 2012 Summer Olympics
Medalists at the 2008 Summer Olympics
Medalists at the 2016 Summer Olympics
Olympic athletes of Australia
Olympic bronze medalists for Australia
Olympic gold medalists for Australia
Olympic silver medalists for Australia
People educated at Ballarat High School
Sportspeople from Ballarat
World Athletics Championships athletes for Australia
World Athletics Championships medalists
World Athletics Race Walking Team Championships winners
Olympic bronze medalists in athletics (track and field)
Olympic gold medalists in athletics (track and field)
Olympic silver medalists in athletics (track and field)
Medallists at the 2006 Commonwealth Games
Medallists at the 2010 Commonwealth Games